Milan Minić (born 4 December 1954) is a Serbian professional basketball coach.

Coaching career (men's basketball) 
Minić was an assistant coach of Serbian coach Dušan Ivković in the Greek League from 1991 to 2001. During that time he was a part of staff in the PAOK, Panionios, Olympiacos and AEK Athens. In 2002, he became head coach of the Aris Thessaloniki. Later, he was coach for the RheinEnergie Köln of the Basketball Bundesliga, the Lokomotiv Rostov of the Russian Super League 1, the Vojvodina Srbijagas of the Serbian Super League and the Adriatic League and for the El Jaish of Qatari League.

Minić was an assistant coach of Serbian coach Aleksandar Đorđević for two seasons, during 2006-07 Italian League season with the Armani Milano and during 2015–2016 Greek League season with the Panathinaikos.

National team 
Minić was an assistant coach of Dušan Ivković, Željko Obradović and Svetislav Pešić in the national team of Yugoslavia, with whom he won three gold medals at the EuroBasket 1995 and the 1998 FIBA World Championship in Greece and EuroBasket 2001 in Turkey.

Minić is current assistant coach of Aleksandar Đorđević in the Serbia national team, with whom he won silver at the 2014 Basketball World Cup in Spain and, a two years later, at the Summer Olympics in Rio de Janeiro.

Coaching career (women's basketball) 
Minić coached 22 December, Crvena zvezda and Voždovac from Belgrade and Spartak from Subotica of the Yugoslav Women's League.

Career achievements

As an assistant coach 
Club competitions
 EuroLeague: 1 (with Olympiacos: 1996-97)
 FIBA Saporta Cup: 1 (with AEK: 1999-00)
 Greek League: 2 (with PAOK: 1991-92 and Olympiacos: 1996-97)
 Greek Cup: 4 (with Olympiacos: 1996-97, with AEK: 1999-00, 2000–01 and Panathinaikos 2015–16)
 VTB United League champion: 1 (with: CSKA Moscow: 2009–10)
 Russian League champion: 1 (with: CSKA Moscow: 2009–10)
 Russian Cup winner: 1 (with: CSKA Moscow: 2009–10)

National team competitions
 1988 Summer Olympics: 
 2016 Summer Olympics: 
 EuroBasket 1995: 
 EuroBasket 2001: 
 EuroBasket 2017: 
 1998 FIBA World Championship: 
 2014 FIBA World Cup:

References

External links 
 Profile at Serbian Association of Basketball Coaches
 Profile at eurobasket.com

1954 births
Living people
Aris B.C. coaches
Basketball players from Ljubljana
Yugoslav basketball coaches
Serbian men's basketball coaches
KK IMT Beograd coaches
KK Vojvodina Srbijagas coaches
PBC Lokomotiv-Kuban coaches
Olympiacos B.C. coaches
Serbian expatriate basketball people in Greece
Serbian expatriate basketball people in Russia
Serbian expatriate basketball people in Italy
Serbian expatriate basketball people in Qatar
Serbian expatriate basketball people in Germany
Slovenian expatriate basketball people in Serbia
ŽKK Crvena zvezda coaches